John Kenneth Muir (born December 3, 1969) is an American literary critic. As of 2022, he has written thirty reference books in the fields of film and television, with a particular focus on the horror and science fiction genres.

Biography
Born December 3, 1969, Muir began his full-time writing career in 1996, penning several books for the North Carolina-based publisher of scholarly reference books, McFarland & Company. Muir also has written monographs about SF-TV, including Exploring Space: 1999 (1997), An Analytical Guide to Battlestar Galactica (1998), A Critical History of Dr. Who on TV (1999), A History and Critical Analysis of Blake's 7 (1999) and An Analytical Guide to TV's One Step Beyond (2001).

Muir was educated at the University of Richmond in Virginia from 1988 to 1992, where he studied for two years under renowned Hudson Review film critic, Bert Cardullo (a student of The New Republic's film critic Stanley Kauffmann). Muir also counts Pauline Kael and Roger Ebert as important career influences.

Muir's first book, Exploring Space: 1999 was published five years after his graduation from University, in April 1997. The book was the first English language attempt to analyse the television series Space: 1999 in a wider cultural context, and is sometimes compared and contrasted with a similar French book written by Pierre Fageolle.

In 2009, Muir became a member of the artist collective, Tecamachalco Underground. The following year he was a judge at the ACEFEST NYC2010 Film Festival, occurring August 20–28, 2010.

Selected works of literary criticism
Muir has written a book about Kevin Smith, titled An Askew View: The Films of Kevin Smith, a study of Sam Raimi titled The Unseen Force: The Films of Sam Raimi, A book on terror television called Terror Television American Series-1970-1999, and another on the works of comedian Christopher Guest and his repertory company, titled Best in Show: The Films of Christ opher Guest and Company. As of 2010, Muir's most recent film director study was Mercy in Her Eyes: The Films of Mira Nair.

Media appearances
Muir has appeared on TV on The E! True Hollywood Story: "Curse of The Exorcist", TV Ontario's Saturday Night at the Movies, and on the premiere episode of the Sci-Fi Channel series Sciography. On radio, Muir has been a guest on Destinies: The Voice of Science Fiction, NiteShift Good Morning Charlotte, The Allan Handelman Show, and The Mitch Albom Show.

In 2007, Muir appeared as a commentator in Decade of Darkness, a special feature on the Collector's Edition DVD release of the 1985 film Return of the Living Dead. He also appeared with others in the 2009 documentary film Nightmares in Red, White and Blue. On October 25, 2010, he was featured on the Biography Channel's The Inside Story: Halloween  documentary about director John Carpenter's 1978 film, Halloween.

Awards and nominations
The Encyclopedia of Superheroes on Film and Television: A New York Public Library's "Best of Reference" Selection, 2005.
Horror Films of the 1970s: A Booklist Editor's Choice for 2002; An Outstanding Reference Source for 2003 by RUSA (Reference Users Service Association), and a "Best of the Best" Reference Book for 2002 by the ALA (American Library Association).
Terror Television: A Booklist Editor's Choice for 2001.2001.
Nomination: Airlock Alpha Best Web Production, The House Between (2009)
Nomination: Sy Fy Portal Best Web Production, The House Between: "Returned" (2008)

Fiction
Muir's first novel was published by Powys Media in 2003, an officially licensed continuation of the Space: 1999 saga, titled The Forsaken. This is the second in the Powys line of Space: 1999 books, following William Latham's Resurrection. Muir's other fiction includes two short stories for The Official Farscape Magazine. In issue #6, for May 2002, his story "That Old Voodoo" was featured. In issue #8, for August 2002, his story "Make a Wish" was published.

Two of his Space: 1999 licensed short stories, "Futility" and "The Touch of Venus", appear in the anthology Space: 1999 Shepherd Moon (2010).

Muir's second novel was published by Powys Media in 2014, another officially licensed novel in the Space: 1999 saga, entitled The Whispering Sea.

His next two novels were novellas in The House Between universe that he created, Enter The House Between Book #1:  Arrived. and Enter The House Between Book #2: Settled. The books were published by  Powys Media on December  3,   2022.

The House Between
In 2006, Muir wrote and directed an original science fiction series titled The House Between, to be broadcast online. The House Between's first-season episode, "Arrived", premiered at Fantasci V in Chesapeake, Virginia, on July 29, 2006. The second season of the series premiered January 25, 2008 and ran through March 2008. A third season began airing online in January 2009.

The House Betweens second-season premiere ("Returned") was nominated for a Sy Fy Genre Award in 2008 under the category "Best Web Production." Sy Fy Radio on August 13, 2008 announced that The House Between placed second out of five productions, behind the bigger-budgeted Star Trek: Of Gods and Men by a margin of less than 100 votes. The third season of the series was nominated for "Best Web Production" at Airlock Alpha, but did not win. Altogether twenty-one episodes of The House Between were produced over three seasons.

Bibliography

Books  
Horror Films 2000 - 2009 (McFarland, 2022)
Joss Whedon FAQ (Applause Theater and Cinema Books, 2019)
The X-Files FAQ (Applause Theater and Cinema Books, 2015)
Space:1999 The Whispering Sea (Powys Media, 2014)
Science Fiction and Fantasy Films of the 1970s (CreateSpace, 2013)
Horror Films FAQ (Applause Theater and Cinema Books; 2013)
Music on Film: Purple Rain (Limelight Editions; 2012)
Horror Films of the 1990s (McFarland, 2011)
Music on Film: This is Spinal Tap (Limelight Editions; 2010)
Space:1999 Shepherd Moon ("The Touch of Venus," "Futility") (Powys Media, 2010)
Ken Russell: Re-Viewing England's Last Mannerist ("As the (White) Worm Turns: Ken Russell as God and Devil of Rubber-Reality Horror Cinema") (Scarecrow Press, 2009)
Battlestar Galactica and Philosophy ("SALTed Popcorn") (Open Court, 2008)
TV Year Volume 1: The Complete 2005–2006 Prime Time Season (Applause Theater and Cinema Books, 2007)
The Rock and Roll Film Encyclopedia" (Applause Theater and Cinema Books, 2007)Horror Films of the 1980s (McFarland, 2007)Mercy in Her Eyes: The Films of Mira Nair (Applause Theatre and Cinema Books, 2006)Singing a New Tune: The Re-Birth of the Modern Film Musical, from Evita to De-Lovely and Beyond (Applause Theatre and Cinema Books, 2005)Best in Show: The Films of Christopher Guest & Company (Applause Theatre and Cinema Books, 2004)The Unseen Force: The Films of Sam Raimi (Applause Theatre and Cinema Books, 2004)The Encyclopedia of Superheroes on Film and Television [McFarland and Company Inc., Publishers, 2004)Space: 1999 – The Forsaken (Powys Media, 2003)Eaten Alive At A Chainsaw Massacre: The Films of Tobe Hooper (McFarland and Company Inc., Publishers, 2003)An Askew View: The Films of Kevin Smith (Applause Theatre and Cinema Books, 2002)Horror Films of the 1970s (McFarland and Company Inc., Publishers, 2002)An Analytical Guide to Television's One Step Beyond, 1959–1961 (McFarland and Company, Inc., Publishers, 2001)Terror Television: American Series, 1970–1999 (McFarland and Company, Inc., Publishers, 2001)The Films of John Carpenter (McFarland and Company, Inc., Publishers, 2000)A History and Critical Analysis of Blake's 7, the 1978–1981 British Television Space Adventure (McFarland and Company Inc., Publishers, 1999)A Critical History of Doctor Who on Television (McFarland and Company Inc., Publishers, 1999)An Analytical Guide to Television's Battlestar Galactica (McFarland and Company Inc., Publishers, 1999)Wes Craven: The Art of Horror (McFarland and Company Inc., Publishers, 1998)Exploring Space:1999 – An Episode Guide and Complete History of the Mid-1970s Science Fiction Television Series (McFarland and Company Inc., Publishers, 1997)

Liner notes & forewords
 Space:1999 Aftershock and Awe by Andrew Gaska (Boom Entertainment, December 2012)
 Lexicon of the Planet of the Apes by Rich Handley (Hasslein Books; September 2010)The House Between: Original Internet Television Score''--compact disc booklet. (Powys Media. April 2010)

References

External links
 
 
 Library Journal Q & A

1969 births
20th-century American essayists
20th-century American historians
21st-century American non-fiction writers
21st-century American novelists
21st-century American essayists
21st-century American historians
American literary critics
American male essayists
American male non-fiction writers
American male novelists
American non-fiction writers
American science fiction writers
American social commentators
American film historians
Film theorists
Living people
Mass media theorists
Philosophers of culture
Philosophers of literature
Philosophers of social science
20th-century American male writers
21st-century American male writers